Allopoda is a genus of false flower beetles in the family Scraptiidae. There are at least three described species in Allopoda.

Species
These three species belong to the genus Allopoda:
 Allopoda arizonica Schaeffer, 1917
 Allopoda californica Schaeffer, 1917
 Allopoda lutea (Haldeman, 1848)

References

Further reading

External links

 

Scraptiidae
Articles created by Qbugbot